Ants Vaino (15 February 1940 – 15 June 1971) was an Estonian racing driver.

He was born in Vändra, Pärnu County.

He began his motorsport career in 1965, coached by Arkadi Nõmmeste. In 1969 and 1970 he won silver medal at Soviet Union championships for Formula 4 class. He is multiple-times Estonian champion in different racing disciplines.

He died on 15 June 1970 in Borovaya circuit in Belarus, due to injuries after formula accident.

References

1940 births
1971 deaths
Estonian racing drivers
People from Vändra
Racing drivers who died while racing